Jack Grant may refer to:

Jack Grant (footballer, born 1915) (1915–1983), Australian rules footballer
Jack Grant (footballer, born 1883) (1883–1954), Australian rules footballer
Jack Grant (rugby union) (born 1994), Australian rugby union footballer

See also
Jackie Grant (1907–1978), West Indian cricketer
Jackie Grant (footballer) (1924–1999), English footballer
Jackson Grant (born 2002), American basketball player